Lisa Brown may refer to:

 Lisa Brown (actress) (1954–2021), American actress
 Lisa Brown (artist) (born 1972), Lisa Michelle, American illustrator and children's writer
 Lisa Brown (boxer) (born 1971), Trinidadian boxer
 Lisa Brown (lawyer) (born 1960), White House staff secretary
 Lisa Brown (Washington politician) (born 1956), former member of the Washington State Senate, Chancellor of Washington State University Spokane and candidate for Congress
 Lisa Brown-Miller (born 1966), American female ice hockey player
 Lisa Brown (Michigan politician) (born 1967), Oakland County Clerk-Register and former member of the Michigan State House of Representatives